Lampedusa Airport is an airport on the Italian island of Lampedusa in the Province of Agrigento, Sicily . It is located a few hundred metres away from the city centre, and reaches its traffic peaks in the summer period, as several airlines run tourism-focused flights to the island.

Airlines and destinations

Statistics

References

External links

Airports in Italy
Airports in Sicily
Lampedusa e Linosa